Common integrals in quantum field theory are all variations and generalizations of Gaussian integrals to the complex plane and to multiple dimensions. Other integrals can be approximated by versions of the Gaussian integral. Fourier integrals are also considered.

Variations on a simple Gaussian integral

Gaussian integral
The first integral, with broad application outside of quantum field theory, is the Gaussian integral.

In physics the factor of 1/2 in the argument of the exponential is common.

Note:

Thus we obtain

Slight generalization of the Gaussian integral

where we have scaled

Integrals of exponents and even powers of x

and

In general

Note that the integrals of exponents and odd powers of x are 0, due to odd symmetry.

Integrals with a linear term in the argument of the exponent

This integral can be performed by completing the square:

Therefore:

Integrals with an imaginary linear term in the argument of the exponent
The integral

By again completing the square we see that the Fourier transform of a Gaussian is also a Gaussian, but in the conjugate variable. This is a demonstration of the uncertainty principle.

This integral is also known as the Hubbard–Stratonovich transformation used in field theory.

Integrals with a complex argument of the exponent
The integral of interest is (for an example of an application see Relation between Schrödinger's equation and the path integral formulation of quantum mechanics)
 

We now assume that  and  may be complex.

Completing the square

By analogy with the previous integrals

See Fresnel integral.

Gaussian integrals in higher dimensions
The one-dimensional integrals can be generalized to multiple dimensions.

Here  is a real positive definite symmetric matrix.

This decouples the variables and allows the integration to be performed as  one-dimensional integrations.

This is best illustrated with a two-dimensional example.

Example: Simple Gaussian integration in two dimensions
The Gaussian integral in two dimensions is

where  is a two-dimensional symmetric matrix with components specified as

and we have used the Einstein summation convention.

Diagonalize the matrix
The first step is to diagonalize the matrix. Note that

We choose  such that:  is diagonal.

Eigenvalues of A
To find the eigenvectors of  one first finds the eigenvalues  of  given by

The eigenvalues are solutions of the characteristic polynomial

which are found using the quadratic equation:

Eigenvectors of A
Substitution of the eigenvalues back into the eigenvector equation yields

From the characteristic equation we know

Also note

The eigenvectors can be written as:

for the two eigenvectors. Here  is a normalizing factor given by,

It is easily verified that the two eigenvectors are orthogonal to each other.

Construction of the orthogonal matrix
The orthogonal matrix is constructed by assigning the normalized eigenvectors as columns in the orthogonal matrix

Note that .

If we define

then the orthogonal matrix can be written

which is simply a rotation of the eigenvectors with the inverse:

Diagonal matrix
The diagonal matrix becomes

with eigenvectors

Numerical example

The eigenvalues are

The eigenvectors are

 
where

Then

The diagonal matrix becomes

with eigenvectors

Rescale the variables and integrate
With the diagonalization the integral can be written

where

Since the coordinate transformation is simply a rotation of coordinates the Jacobian determinant of the transformation is one yielding

The integrations can now be performed.

which is the advertised solution.

Integrals with complex and linear terms in multiple dimensions
With the two-dimensional example it is now easy to see the generalization to the complex plane and to multiple dimensions.

Integrals with a linear term in the argument

Integrals with an imaginary linear term

Integrals with a complex quadratic term

Integrals with differential operators in the argument
As an example consider the integral

In analogy with the matrix version of this integral the solution is

where

Similar arguments yield

and

See Path-integral formulation of virtual-particle exchange for an application of this integral.

Integrals that can be approximated by the method of steepest descent

In quantum field theory n-dimensional integrals of the form

appear often. These integrals can be approximated by the method of steepest descent.

For small values of Planck's constant, f can be expanded about its minimum

Here  is the n by n matrix of second derivatives evaluated at the minimum of the function.

If we neglect higher order terms this integral can be integrated explicitly.

Integrals that can be approximated by the method of stationary phase

A common integral is a path integral of the form

where  is the classical action and the integral is over all possible paths that a particle may take. In the limit of small  the integral can be evaluated in the stationary phase approximation. In this approximation the integral is over the path in which the action is a minimum. Therefore, this approximation recovers the classical limit of mechanics.

Fourier integrals

Dirac delta distribution
The Dirac delta distribution in spacetime can be written as a Fourier transform

In general, for any dimension

Fourier integrals of forms of the Coulomb potential

Laplacian of 1/r

While not an integral, the identity in three-dimensional Euclidean space

where

is a consequence of Gauss's theorem and can be used to derive integral identities. For an example see Longitudinal and transverse vector fields.

This identity implies that the Fourier integral representation of 1/r is

Yukawa Potential: The Coulomb potential with mass
The Yukawa potential in three dimensions can be represented as an integral over a Fourier transform

where

See Static forces and virtual-particle exchange for an application of this integral.

To derive this result note:

Modified Coulomb potential with mass

where the hat indicates a unit vector in three dimensional space. The derivation of this result is as follows:

Longitudinal potential with mass

where the hat indicates a unit vector in three dimensional space. The derivation for this result is as follows:

Note that in the small  limit the integral reduces to

Transverse potential with mass

In the small mr limit the integral goes to

For large distance, the integral falls off as the inverse cube of r

For applications of this integral see Darwin Lagrangian and Darwin interaction in a vacuum.

Angular integration in cylindrical coordinates
There are two important integrals. The angular integration of an exponential in cylindrical coordinates can be written in terms of Bessel functions of the first kind

and

For applications of these integrals see Magnetic interaction between current loops in a simple plasma or electron gas.

Bessel functions

Integration of the cylindrical propagator with mass

First power of a Bessel function

See Abramowitz and Stegun.

For , we have

For an application of this integral see Two line charges embedded in a plasma or electron gas.

Squares of Bessel functions
The integration of the propagator in cylindrical coordinates is

For small mr the integral becomes

For large mr the integral becomes

For applications of this integral see Magnetic interaction between current loops in a simple plasma or electron gas.

In general

Integration over a magnetic wave function
The two-dimensional integral over a magnetic wave function is

Here, M is a confluent hypergeometric function. For an application of this integral see Charge density spread over a wave function.

See also
Relation between Schrödinger's equation and the path integral formulation of quantum mechanics

References

Mathematical physics